Adolph Robert Thornton Jr. (July 27, 1985 – November 17, 2021), better known by his stage name Young Dolph, was an American rapper. In 2016, he released his debut studio album, King of Memphis, which peaked at number 49 on the Billboard 200 chart. He was featured on O.T. Genasis's hit single "Cut It", which peaked at number 35 on the Billboard Hot 100. Young Dolph's seventh album, Rich Slave, was released in 2020 and became his highest-charting project, debuting at number four on the Billboard 200.

On November 17, 2021, he was shot and killed in Memphis, Tennessee.

Early life 
Adolph Robert Thornton Jr. was born on July 27, 1985, in Chicago, Illinois. When he was two years old, his family moved to Memphis, Tennessee. He had two sisters and two brothers; he and rapper Juice Wrld were second cousins. Thornton was mostly raised by his grandmother, Ida Mae; his parents experienced addictions to crack cocaine, and as a child, he would only see them every few weeks.

Thornton said that the community he was from in South Memphis, many of his peers were raised by their grandmothers due to the issues experienced by their parents. He described initially recognizing his grandmother as "the meanest motherfucker in the world", explaining "I didn't get that shit at the time. ... All the shit she was telling you, you get to seeing that shit when you hit about 15", saying that when he approached that age he began utilizing her teachings throughout his life to be more independent. As a teenager, Thornton attended Hamilton High School.

His grandmother often did not allow Thornton to have friends visit their home, but on occasion let homeless friends stay with the family.  On March 5, 2008, she passed away due to a battle with lung cancer.

Career

2008–2014: Career beginnings and early successes 
In 2008, due to encouragement from his friends, Young Dolph released his first mixtape Paper Route Campaign. Seeing its local popularity, he decided to fully invest himself into rap. Two years later, he formally established his label Paper Route Empire in 2010, an independent record label, and subsequently released his first mainstream mixtape Welcome 2 Dolph World that same year, hosted by Atlanta DJ DJ Scream with features from 8Ball & MJG, 2 Chainz (then known as Tity Boi), and in-house artists Tim Gates and Money Makkin Murda. With the release of mixtapes High Class Street Music and High Class Street Music 2 in 2011, Young Dolph began to develop his own rap flow, shifting away from a style similar to Memphis rappers Three 6 Mafia and 8Ball & MJG instead to a personal style described as "vociferous" with a "magnetic delivery and uniquely deep voice". In 2012, Young Dolph released the mixtapes A Time 2 Kill and Blue Magic on April 12 and November 14, respectively. The former's title was inspired by the movie of the same name, and the latter's title inspired by the movie American Gangster. Following multiple collaborations along with a personal connection with Atlanta trap rapper Gucci Mane, Young Dolph released the collaboration mixtape EastAtlantaMemphis on March 15, 2013, with features from Young Scooter and Big Bank Black. On May 13, 2013, he released the third installment of the High Class Street Music series, Trappin' Out a Mansion. On October 15, 2013, Young Dolph released South Memphis Kingpin, with the song "South Memphis" achieving high popularity. On April 15, 2014, Dolph released Cross Country Trappin. On July 8, 2014, Young Dolph released the fourth installment of the High Class Street Music series, American Gangster. This mixtape included the song "Preach", which received nationwide fame, as well as features from Gucci Mane, 2 Chainz, Fiend, Trinidad James, Shy Glizzy, Trae tha Truth, Problem, and Cap 1.

2014-2017: Debut album and feud with Yo Gotti 
On February 24, 2015, Young Dolph released the fifth and final installment of the High Class Street Music series, The Plug Best Friend. It included features from 2 Chainz, Shy Glizzy, and Peewee Longway, as well as a remix of "Preach" featuring Rick Ross and Jeezy. On June 30, Dolph released a collaboration album with Gucci Mane and Peewee Longway titled Felix Brothers. On July 28, 2015, Dolph released mixtape 16 Zips with features from T.I., Slim Thug, Paul Wall, Jadakiss, and fellow Paper Route artist Jay Fizzle. In September 2015, Young Dolph was featured on O.T. Genasis's double platinum hit single "Cut It". On October 8, 2015, Young Dolph released Shittin on the Industry, an 11-song mixtape including the hit single "Get Paid".

In February 2016, he released his debut album King of Memphis under his independent Paper Route Empire label, which peaked at number 49 on the Billboard 200. Other Memphis rappers (including Yo Gotti and Gotti-affiliated Blac Youngsta) took offense at the album title, with Blac Youngsta leading an armed group attempting to find Young Dolph in Memphis and releasing a diss track, "SHAKE SUM (Young Dolph Diss)" in response.

In 2017, Young Dolph released a diss track against Yo Gotti titled "Play Wit Yo' Bitch", prompting Yo Gotti to release a response song. Two weeks later, in February 2017, Young Dolph released a music video for "Play Wit Yo' Bitch". The next day, his vehicle was the target of gunfire in Charlotte, North Carolina, while in town for a performance at the Central Intercollegiate Athletic Association tournament. His car was reportedly shot over 100 times but was outfitted with bulletproof panels, and no one was hurt.

Following the shooting, Blac Youngsta and two other men were arrested, but the charges were later dropped due to insufficient evidence. Young Dolph used the publicity from the shooting to promote his second studio album Bulletproof. In September 2017, he was shot multiple times. In February 2018, he released the extended play Niggas Get Shot Everyday, referencing this prior incident.

2017–2020: Charting singles and first top 10 album 

In 2017, Young Dolph signed his cousin-by-marriage and fellow Memphis rapper Key Glock to his Paper Route Empire label, after the two had met at family gatherings. In 2018, they released the single "Major", which peaked at number 47 on the Hot R&B/Hip-Hop Songs chart. That same year, Young Dolph said that he had been offered a $22 million label deal which he turned down. Preferring to stay on his own independent label, Young Dolph stated, "It really was a good deal, a super good deal to tell you the truth. But it's just, I see something else".

Young Dolph later revealed that he signed a distribution deal with Empire Distribution, and his September 2018 album Role Model was released under the label Paper Route Empire, a joint venture between Paper Route Empire and Empire Distribution. In July 2019, Young Dolph again collaborated with Key Glock, this time releasing his first collaborative album entitled Dum and Dummer, imitating the title of the Farrelly brothers' film Dumb and Dumber.

The album peaked at number eight on the Billboard 200, earning each of the artists their first top 10 album. The album was produced by BandPlay, who used a variety of styles of beats in the album's tracks. Reviewers for the album noted Young Dolph's greater "songwriting range", with "depths of self-loathing and despair" that were complemented by the younger Key Glock's "celebrations of himself".

2020–2021: Retirement plans and top 10 solo album 
Rumors emerged in early 2020 that Young Dolph was considering his retirement from music in order to spend more time with his children, and was seen more frequently in Memphis. On his Instagram, Young Dolph wrote, "Highly considering quitting the music business because I really wanna be with my kids 24/7". During the COVID-19 pandemic in the United States, Young Dolph released the single "Sunshine" and released edited album covers of previous releases on streaming services to feature individuals wearing surgical masks to highlight and address the global situation.

In an interview with GQ in May 2020, he was asked about his recent release of music, with Young Dolph replying "Man, my little boy wanted to hear some new music. ...  I'll keep it real: I ain't really been on my rapper shit, I been on my industry shit, the big bro shit. I got a lot of artists, and I been dropping all my artists' projects, and they going up. ... So I'm like, 'Yeah, I gotta go ahead and give it to them.' I gotta drop it."

Young Dolph's seventh album, Rich Slave, was released on August 14, 2020. It was preceded by the singles "Blue Diamonds", "RNB" featuring Megan Thee Stallion and "Death Row". Young Dolph explained the album's title, stating "It's the reality of being Black in this country". Rich Slave was Young Dolph's highest-charting album, peaking at 4th on the Billboard 200.

On March 5, 2021, Young Dolph and Key Glock released the single "Aspen", and subsequently their second collaborative album, Dum and Dummer 2, was released on March 26, 2021. It is a sequel to 2019's Dum and Dummer, and combined solo songs with tracks featuring both artists. The project's cartoon artwork references Beavis and Butt-Head. The album was released by Young Dolph's independent Paper Route Empire label. In a review on Pitchfork, Nadine Smith gave the album a 7.5/10 rating, stating that "Dolph & Glock fashion themselves in the image of pop culture dunces even if at the same time they’re poised, extravagant, and immaculate—there’s a casualness to their rapport and respective flows that never announces itself too much."

Posthumous releases
A posthumous tribute album titled Long Live Young Dolph was announced on January 10, 2022, and was officially released on January 21, 2022, through Paper Route Empire. It was preceded by the release of the single "LLD (Long Live Dolph)". The compilation album contains guest appearances from PRE associates: Key Glock, Big Moochie Grape, Kenny Muney, Jay Fizzle, Joddy Badass, Snupe Bandz, Paper Route Woo and Chitana.

A posthumous album from Dolph, titled Paper Route Frank, was released on December 16, 2022.

Personal life
Thornton had two children with his partner, Mia Jaye. He said that he was somewhat strict with his parenting due to his upbringing with his grandmother. Thornton often collaborated with his cousin and fellow rapper Key Glock and was a distant relative of the rapper and singer Juice Wrld, learning of the familial relation with the latter in 2017.

Thornton was shot outside a retail store in Hollywood, Los Angeles, on September 26, 2017. He was listed in critical condition at the hospital, but within a few hours doctors reported he was expected to survive. He spent two weeks in the hospital recovering from three gunshot wounds. Yo Gotti was initially named a person of interest moments after the shooting but was later cleared. Yo Gotti's friend, Corey McClendon, was arrested for attempted murder, only to be released the next day with no charges.

During the COVID-19 pandemic in 2020, Thornton began to stay with his family in Memphis more frequently and did so amid rumors of retirement. He was known in the area for his philanthropy, donating $25,000 to his alma mater, Hamilton High School, and providing motivational speeches to students. Known for handing out Thanksgiving dinners, Thornton gave away two hundred turkeys to individuals at the West Cancer Center days before his death and was scheduled to donate additional meals days later.

Death 

On November 17, 2021, Young Dolph was fatally shot in Memphis whilst visiting Makeda's Homemade Butter Cookies, a bakery he frequented whenever he was back home. Two gunmen in a white two-door Mercedes-Benz gunned him down. An autopsy revealed that Thornton had 22 gunshot wounds from bullet entries and exits. Some  wounds were sustained in the forehead and back. Crowds of hundreds of people swarmed the scene of Thornton's death for hours; police had to prevent individuals from entering the area while they investigated. Tennessee House Representative London Lamar and Memphis councilman J. B. Smiley reacted by calling for a curfew in Memphis to prevent civil unrest and violence.

Young Dolph was laid to rest on Tuesday, November 30, 2021. A service was held at First Baptist Church Broad Street. The family's caravan of black SUVs was escorted by security and Memphis Police to the cemetery across from Hamilton High School, Young Dolph's alma mater.

On January 5, 2022, police identified one of the suspects responsible for the murder as 23-year-old Justin Johnson, and issued a first-degree murder warrant. A reward of up to $15,000 for information on the suspect was offered by the Tennessee authorities. Johnson had an established history of criminal charges and violence, as well as "ties to organized criminal gangs," and was a rapper under the name Straight Drop.

Another suspect, 32-year-old Cornelius Smith (who was arrested for the theft of the car used in Dolph's murder), was indicted on first-degree murder, weapons possession, and theft charges on January 11. The same day, Johnson was captured by police in Indiana after law enforcement received over 500 tips leading to his arrest. 27-year-old Shundale Barnett, a passenger of the vehicle Johnson was driving, was also arrested. On January 12, Johnson and Smith were indicted on first-degree murder and other criminal charges, while Barnett was charged with being an "after-the-fact accessory."

After Johnson and Smith struggled to find legal representation, they were given an ultimatum by Judge Lee Coffee: "If you have a lawyer hired, that's fine, but as I told you 10 days ago, I cannot allow you to sit in jail week after week, month after month, without a lawyer. … If you don't have a lawyer hired on [February 4], I'm going to hire a private attorney to represent both of you all." On February 7, Johnson appeared in court again for "violating a sex offender registration charge" after reportedly being convicted of aggravated rape in 2015. He also claimed he was unable to afford to hire an attorney. On February 11, both Johnson and Smith pleaded not guilty to first-degree murder.
On November 10, 2022, a third suspect was indicted for the murder of Young Dolph and the conspiracy to murder Thornton, 43-year-old Hernandez Govan, whom is alleged to have ordered the murder of Young Dolph.
It is likely that the trial for those accused of murdering Young Dolph will not occur until 2024 due to the severity of charges and the discovery procedures by the defendants' attorneys.

Remembrance
The city of Memphis approved street-renaming for a street in the honor of Thornton. The street was changed to Adolph "Young Dolph" Thornton Jr. Avenue, which is located on the intersection of Dunn Avenue and Airways Boulevard, just east of Castilia Heights (where Dolph was raised) and not far from where Dolph was killed.

In February 2022, two Tennessee lawmakers (Representative Torrey C. Harris and former Senator Katrina Robinson) proposed a bill which would make November 17 – the day on which Dolph was killed – the "Adolph Thornton Day of Service." The bill listed several of Dolph's acts of philanthropy and described him as "an exemplary gentleman and consummate professional who worked assiduously to improve the quality of life for his fellow citizens in numerous capacities". It also stated the holiday's goal is to "celebrate the memory, music, and community service contributions of [Dolph] and to encourage Tennesseans to help others."

Discography

Studio albums

Compilation albums

Mixtapes

Extended plays

Singles

As lead artist

As featured artist

Other charted songs 

Notes

See also 
 List of murdered hip hop musicians

References

External links 

 
 

1985 births
2021 deaths
2021 murders in the United States
20th-century African-American people
21st-century African-American musicians
21st-century American male musicians
21st-century American rappers
African-American male rappers
African-American songwriters
American male songwriters
Deaths by firearm in Tennessee
Murdered African-American people
Rappers from Chicago
Rappers from Memphis, Tennessee
Songwriters from Tennessee
Southern hip hop musicians
Trap musicians
Gangsta rappers